Uppsala Central Station is a railway station in Uppsala, Sweden. It lies on the East Coast Line, which runs south to Stockholm and north to Gävle and Sundsvall. It is also the southeastern terminus for the Dala Line which runs northwest ending in Mora. There are frequent commuter services to Stockholm. Long-distance trains, such as the SJ 3000, connect Uppsala to the northern parts of the country. Many trains, including the Stockholm commuter rail (Pendeltåg), also leave the main line to connect Uppsala with Stockholm-Arlanda Airport. Next to the station is a hub for the regional coach services operated by Upplands Lokaltrafik. Many local bus routes run through or near the station grounds as well, and there is a large area set aside for bicycle parking.

Located just beside Uppsala Central Station is Uppsala East Station, the western terminus of the Upsala-Lenna Jernväg heritage railway, which was relocated closer to Uppsala C in 2012.

History

Old station building (1866–2011) 
The old station building was designed by Adolf W. Edelsvärd, who described its architecture as "Dutch Renaissance-style". Along with the accompanying railway, the station was opened in September 1866 by king Charles XV. Originally, the building had an adjoining rail depot with a tower in each corner, however this was demolished in 1918. The building has been expanded twice, once in 1889 and again in 1918. The ground floor was renovated completely 1934–35. In 1986, the building was listed (protected as a cultural heritage) by the Swedish Government. After the station building became defunct in 2011, a brasserie opened in the building.

Renovation (2005–2011) 
From 2005 to 2011, the station site was renovated to build the Resecentrum (Travel Centre) which opened in December 2011. This project included: a new station building, just to the south of the existing one — constructed 2009–2010; an underpass under the tracks for pedestrians and bicycles; Stadshusgatan, a busway on the west side of the station, so that passengers no longer need to cross Kungsgatan to reach southbound buses (northbound buses remain on the near side of Kungsgatan); Stationsgatan, a new road extending Storgatan on the east side of the station; a new car park, and more bicycle parking; a new public square, and various beautification projects. The total cost of the project exceeded US$200 million.

According to an opinion poll, published in Uppsalatidningen on 14 January 2011, where 1,247 people had been asked whether they believed that the new centre was important for Uppsala as a cultural centre and university town, and for the commercial activity in the area, 47% of the respondents stated that they believed it to be "very important" and 34% answered "fairly important".

Underpass flooding (2018) 
On 29 July 2018, the station's pedestrian underpass was flooded due to heavy rain after a long dry period. Several people decided to use the underpass as a swimming pool, bringing floats, snorkeling gear, and water pistols. This received international media coverage. The underpass was closed due to fears that the water posed a risk of electrocution. Later that night, the water was pumped out.

Future plans 
In 2018, it was announced that the number of southbound tracks (towards Stockholm) would be doubled, from 2 to 4. At an estimated cost of 6.7 billion Swedish kronor (€660M as of July 2021), construction is set to begin in 2026. To accommodate the increased traffic, the station complex will be widened and new platforms built.

Services

SJ 
SJ operates northbound high-speed rail services to Sundsvall, Umeå, Östersund, and Duved using the SJ 3000. Inter-city rail services run west to Falun and Mora, north to Gävle and Ljusdal, and south to Stockholm and Linköping. Regional services run to Stockholm, with an approximate frequency of 2 trains per hour, and occasionally to Örebro as part of the Mälartåg network. SJ also runs night trains to Umeå and Duved.

Upplands Lokaltrafik 
Upplands Lokaltrafik (UL) operates the Upptåget commuter rail service. It runs north on the East Coast Line with trains to Tierp and Gävle using the ER1 double-decker train. It also serves Sala on the Dala Line using the older X52. It primarily uses the northbound terminating platforms. Twice weekly, it also continues south to Stockholm Arlanda Airport. The company also operates the local and regional bus services at the station.

Storstockholms Lokaltrafik 
Storstockholms Lokaltrafik (SL) operates frequent commuter rail services to Stockholm and Södertälje using the X60 as part of the Stockholm commuter rail network.

Vy Tåg 
As of 13 December 2020, Vy Tåg operates night trains to Narvik and Luleå after taking over from SJ.

Gallery

Notes

References

External links

Railway stations in Uppsala County
Railway stations opened in 1866
Buildings and structures in Uppsala
1866 establishments in Sweden
Transit centers in Sweden